Club Deportivo Motril Atlético is a Spanish football team based in Motril, Granada, in the autonomous community of Andalusia. Founded in 2009, it plays in Tercera Provincial, holding home matches at Estadio Paulino Salgado, with a capacity of 1,500 seats.

Season to season

External links
Official website
lapreferente.com profile

Football clubs in Andalusia
Association football clubs established in 2009
Divisiones Regionales de Fútbol clubs
2009 establishments in Spain